The Scotian Shelf is a geological formation, part of the Continental shelf, located southwest of Nova Scotia, Canada. The Scotian Shelf contains the ecologically important Scotian Shelf Large Marine Ecosystem (LME) and the Scotian Shelf Waters (SSW).

The southwestern boundary ends at the Northeast Channel, including the Gulf of Maine.

These culminate at Sable Island.

A southwesterly ocean current, (occasionally containing runoff from the Gulf of St Lawrence) flows over the inner shelf. The water flow over the banks is weaker and tends have greater variation. Currents flow through this canyon southward, mixing offshore waters with the Nova Scotia Current. This causes an increase in biological productivity toward the east, across the Continental Shelf.and contains body parts from multiple decades of animals 

The Scotian Shelf is heavily influenced by the Gulf Stream, resulting in a variety of marine species being present which are normally found further south. These appear at regular intervals due to the main current spinning off cores of warm water.

Marine life

The Scotian Shelf Large Marine Ecosystem (LME) contains numerous species, including a broad range of shellfish and fishes that use the area as spawning and nursery grounds. This abundance is the reason that the Scotian Shelf is one of the Atlantic Ocean's most fished areas. 

The right whale has a critical habitat in the Roseway Basin, the northeastern part of the Scotian Shelf. Approximately 30 percent of the known population uses this habitat throughout the course of the year.

The northern bottlenose whale also lives in the Scotian Shelf Waters area, in particular, the Gully. About 230 individual specimens have been recorded there. Other species, such as the sperm whale and harbour seal, are also found in this region, including the grey seal, which is common on Sable Island.

Various waterfowl use the coastal areas as a migratory staging area. Offshore areas are used by such birds as shearwaters, sea ducks such as the common eider, and alcids such as dovekies and murres.

References

External links
 Image
Benthic habitat mapping on the Scotian Shelf based on multibeam bathymetry, surficial geology and sea floor photographs, Marine Ecology Progress Series, Vol. 219: 121–137,  September 10, 2001
The Scotian Shelf In Context: State of the Scotian Shelf Report, Fisheries and Oceans Canada, 
Eastern Scotian Shelf And Barents Sea Intercomparison: Climate Fluctuation, Human Impact and  System Resilience, ICES Annual Science Conference, Nantes 20.-24. September 2010

Landforms of Nova Scotia
Continental shelves of North America
Landforms of the Atlantic Ocean
Landforms of the United States